Luis Javier Paradela Díaz (born 21 January 1997) is a Cuban professional footballer who plays for Deportivo Saprissa and the Cuba national team. He primarily plays as a attacking midfielder, but can also be deployed as a winger or a forward.

Club career

Youth career
Paradela began his youth career in his native Cuba with club FC Matanzas.

Universidad SC
He joined Universidad SC in 2019, making his competitive debut for Universidad SC in a 2–1 home defeat against Sansare FC on January 20, 2019, during the Clausura tournament of the 2018-2019 season. He scored his first goal and brace in a 4-1 home victory over Deportivo Achuapa on January 26, 2019, followed by another brace four days later in a 2-2 away tie against Aurora F.C.

Reno 1868
In August 2019, Paradela joined USL Championship side Reno 1868 on loan. Paradela became the first Cuban soccer player to play in the United States without defecting. Due to the unique unprecedented process, the P1 VISA took months to be processed and was obtained with only single entry and for 90 days validity. The player was cleared to arrive in Reno only with 6 games remaining in the season.

Jocoro
In late January 2020, after being denied return to the USL Championship due to pressure from the Football Association of Cuba, and missing out on several offers in different countries due immigration bottlenecks, Paradela joined Jocoro F.C. in the La Liga Mayor, playing six matches before the cancellation of the Clausura 2020 due to the Covid19 pandemic.

Chalatenango
In August 2020, after not being able to join Santos de Guápiles F.C. in Costa Rica due to the Covid19 pandemic travel restrictions, Luis Paradela confirmed his commitment to play the Apertura 2020 with C.D. Chalatenango. The offer by Santos de Guápiles F.C. remained valid for the Clausura 2021.

Santos de Guápiles
In early January 2021, Paradela transferred to Santos de Guápiles in the Liga FPD debuting shortly after in a match against C.S. Cartaginés. 

In 2022, Paradela was awarded the best foreign player of the 2021-22 season award for his excellent performance in the Apertura 2021. His participation in the Clausura 2022 was limited to 7 games only due to an immigration issue affecting several foreign players in Costa Rica, which also prevented him from participating in the Concacaf Champions League 2022 series against New York City FC.

Saprissa

Paradela was signed by Saprissa on a transfer from Santos in the summer of 2022 along with his offensive partner Javon East. He quickly established himself as a fans’ favorite, scoring 4 goals in his first 6 matches at the club.

International career
On 27 August 2018, Parabela made his official senior international debut for Cuba in a friendly against Barbados. He scored a hat-trick against Turks and Caicos Islands on 8 September 2018 in an 11–0 victory, helping Cuba to their biggest ever win.

Paradela was included in the best eleven of 2019–20 CONCACAF Nations League qualifying and was among the top scorers with five goals.

International goals
Scores and results list Cuba's goal tally first.

Style of play
Paradela is a talented, fast, skillful, and hardworking player, with good technique, a short stature, and a strong build. He usually plays as a left winger, a position which enables him to beat opponents with the ball, cut into the centre, and shoot on goal from outside the area with his stronger right foot, although he is also an accurate striker of the ball with his left foot; he is also capable of creating chances for teammates as well as scoring goals himself. He is also known for his defensive contribution off the ball, and has been deployed anywhere along the front line, as well as in several midfield positions, most frequently as either an attacking midfielder, although he has also been used as a main or second striker on occasion.

References

1997 births
Living people
Cuban footballers
Cuban expatriate footballers
Cuba international footballers
Association football forwards
People from Matanzas Province
2019 CONCACAF Gold Cup players
FC Pinar del Río players
Universidad de San Carlos players
Reno 1868 FC players
Jocoro F.C. players
C.D. Chalatenango footballers
Santos de Guápiles footballers
Deportivo Saprissa players
USL Championship players
Primera División de Fútbol Profesional players
Liga FPD players
Cuban expatriate sportspeople in Guatemala
Cuban expatriate sportspeople in the United States
Cuban expatriate sportspeople in El Salvador
Cuban expatriate sportspeople in Costa Rica
Expatriate footballers in Guatemala
Expatriate soccer players in the United States
Expatriate footballers in El Salvador
Expatriate footballers in Costa Rica